Hurricane Alberto was the farthest-travelling tropical cyclone on record in the Atlantic Ocean. The third tropical cyclone, first named storm, and first hurricane of the 2000 Atlantic hurricane season, Alberto developed near the western coast of Africa from a tropical wave on August 3. Initially a tropical depression, it strengthened into Tropical Storm Alberto early on August 4. While briefly turning westward on August 6, Alberto attained hurricane status. Shortly thereafter, Alberto re-curved northwestward and began encountering increased wind shear. As a result, Alberto weakened back to a tropical storm on August 9. However, the system quickly re-strengthened as winds became more favorable, and early on August 10, Alberto became a hurricane again. The storm gradually curved northward and north-northeastward between August 11 and August 12; Alberto attained its peak intensity with winds of  during that time.

Increasing upper-level westerlies caused Alberto to weaken as it moved east-northeastward, with the cyclone losing most of its convection. Early on August 14, Alberto was downgraded to a tropical storm. A westerly trough that had been guiding Alberto outran the storm, and strong ridging developed to the north and west. As a result, Alberto turned southward on August 15, southwestward on August 16, and then to the west on August 17. While curving northwestward and then northward, Alberto began to re-strengthen, and was upgraded to a hurricane for a third time on August 18. After weakening back to a Category 1 hurricane, Alberto conducted an unusually large cyclonic loop, spanning approximately 5 degrees latitude and 8 degrees longitude. The cyclone was downgraded to a tropical storm on August 23, shortly before completing its extratropical transition. Although it did not affect land while tropical, the precursor tropical wave caused light rainfall in Senegal. The remnant extratropical cyclone also likely produced tropical storm-force winds in Iceland and Jan Mayen.

Meteorological history

A mesoscale convective complex, or large circular area of thunderstorms, developed in the Ethiopian Highlands of Africa on July 28. The complex moved west-southwestward through the continent, waxing and waning until persisting along a tropical wave on August 2. The next day, the wave emerged into the Atlantic Ocean from Guinea. Once over the open Atlantic Ocean, the wave quickly developed and became Tropical Depression Three later that day. The depression moved to the west-northwest and was upgraded to Tropical Storm Alberto early on August 4. Alberto continued to strengthen, but moved to cooler waters late on August 5 and weakened briefly. However, the storm strengthened again early on August 6, and it was upgraded to hurricane status as an eye became visible. The upgrade was accompanied with a brief westward turn.

A vigorous upper-level low developed west of Alberto on August 7 and August 8. This caused an increase in vertical shear, weakening the hurricane down to a tropical storm on August 9. The low also caused the storm to turn to the northwest. However, on August 10, Alberto became better organised and was upgraded to hurricane status again. It then moved in a gradual curve towards the north and northeast through a break in a subtropical ridge between August 11 and August 12. Alberto was an unusual storm in that it reached its peak intensity at a high latitude, north of 35˚N, after it had re-curved. The hurricane began to weaken due to increasing upper-level westerlies on August 13 and August 14, while moving east-northeastward. Alberto was downgraded to a tropical storm on August 14.

As early as August 10, computer models anticipated the hurricane to accelerate to the northeast and become extratropical within three days, but this did not occur. A westerly trough that had been influencing Alberto's motion outran the storm, and a strong ridge developed to the north and west, causing the storm to turn abruptly to the south on August 15, and to complete a large loop over the open Atlantic. Alberto turned to the southwest on August 16 and to the west on August 17. The storm then took a sharp turn toward the northwest as a large, slow-moving mid-level trough was carving out over the eastern United States. Alberto began to strengthen, and reached hurricane status for the third time on August 18. The hurricane continued to turn to the north on August 19 and to the northeast on August 20 and August 21.

Hurricane Alberto began to weaken on August 22 as it accelerated into higher latitudes. It was downgraded to a tropical storm early on August 23. Initially, it was forecast to become extratropical on August 22, but a little burst of colder cloud tops enabled Alberto to remain tropical for a longer time, persisting into August 23, while it moved into a very high latitude of 53˚N.  The weakening storm finally became extratropical late on August 23, while accelerating to the north-northeast, passing near Iceland on August 24. Gale-force winds became non-existent, as the centre turned to the east-northeast on August 25.

Impact, records, and naming
Very minimal impact occurred as a result from Hurricane Alberto. Dakar, Senegal, received  of rain as the pre-Alberto tropical wave passed over the city. A discussion was issued on August 9 advising residents in Bermuda to monitor the progress of the storm until it safely passed. Also, from August 12 to August 14, public advisories were issued advising people from Azores to monitor the progress of Hurricane Alberto. This stopped when Alberto began to slow its motion and began to turn to the south, away from the Azores. Some swells were reported along the east coast of the United States a few days after the storm's recurvature. No reports were available on the impact of Alberto on Iceland, but it was estimated that winds of at least tropical storm force were experienced there. Otherwise, there were no known reports of damage or casualties as a result of Hurricane Alberto.

Hurricane Alberto completed the largest loop ever observed over the Atlantic Ocean, spanning approximately 5 degrees latitude by 8 degrees longitude. The storm is currently the ninth longest-lived storm in the Atlantic Ocean (lasting 19.75 days), and is also the second longest-lived Atlantic storm during August (the longest lived is the 1899 Hurricane San Ciriaco). Also, Alberto is the farthest-travelling in the Atlantic (travelling 6,500 miles), being able to retain tropical characteristics at an unusually high latitude, up to 53˚N. The last storm to do so was Hurricane Frances in 1980.

See also

 Other storms of the same name
 Hurricane Kate (2003) - Storm of similar intensity that took a similar path
 Hurricane Nadine - A long lasting storm with a similarly unusual path

References

External links

 National Hurricane Center's archive on Hurricane Alberto
 National Hurricane Center's Tropical Cyclone Report on Hurricane Alberto
 Track of Alberto from Unisys

2000 Atlantic hurricane season
Category 3 Atlantic hurricanes
Alberto (2000)
Alberto